Ottershaw is a village in the Borough of Runnymede in Surrey, England, approximately  southwest of central London. The village developed in the mid-19th century from a number of separate hamlets and became a parish in its own right in 1871.

The M25 is accessible via junction 11.

Economy and transport
Ottershaw is largely a mixture of a London commuter belt and a retirement settlement.

Amenities
A significant landmark is Christ Church. Sir Edward Colebrooke (1813–90), who bought the Ottershaw Park estate in 1859, built the church on his estate as a memorial to his deceased son and heir. From its consecration in 1864, it was opened to the local community for worship.

A junior school here is linked to this church.  A boarding school for boys, Ottershaw School, was founded in 1948 in Ottershaw Park; it closed in 1980. The school buildings were converted for residential use.

History
The Ottershaw Society has carried out a comparative, now and then, survey of the village comprising more than 1,000 images (photographs and illustrations) from the mid-19th century to the present time, older residents' memories and various other historical written material. The Victoria County History collaborative historians' work captures the village under its Chertsey entries, as with Addlestone, considering in its 1910s edition some ties to Chertsey remained strong.

Leisure
Foxhills Golf Club is in the more rural western side of the area. The village has two pubs: the Otter, which has a restaurant, and the Castle in Brox Road. It also has an Indian restaurant, Three Rooms. Ottershaw FC play their home games at Egham Cricket Club and play in the Surrey County Intermediate League Premier (Western) Step 8 of non-league football. 2016/17 Charity Cup Winners, 2017/18 Surrey County Cup Winners. The adult development side play in Guildford & Woking Alliance League Division 1. 
Homewood parkrun takes place in Ottershaw Memorial Fields each Saturday at 9am. It initially took place in Homewood park, but moved to Ottershaw after 13 events.

Notable residents

Living people
 Oliver James, musician and actor, was born in 1980 in Ottershaw.
 John Romer, Egyptologist and historian, was born and educated in Ottershaw.
 Hannah Russell, British Paralympic swimmer, was born in Chertsey and lives in Ottershaw.  At the 2012 Summer Paralympic Games she won silver in the S12 400m freestyle, and bronze in the 100m butterfly – setting a new British record, and bronze in the 100m backstroke.

Historical figures
 Robert Sewell, Attorney General of Jamaica  and British MP, was born at Ottershaw Park.

Ottershaw in literature
In the book The War of the Worlds by H G Wells, the fictional narrator is invited to an observatory in Ottershaw.

See also
 Christ Church, Ottershaw
 Ottershaw School

References

External links

Ottershaw Village Society
Ottershaw Park History
Ottershaw Players
Village Home Page
Christ Church, Ottershaw (Anglican)
Ottershaw School Old Boys' Society
Ottershaw FC
Homewood parkrun

 
19th-century establishments in England
Borough of Runnymede
Villages in Surrey